Filip Naudts (born 7 December 1968) is a photographer and photography reviewer based in Belgium.

Biography
In 1992, Naudts began his career working for the Belgian national television and press. The following year, he was employed by the Antwerp Fotomuseum, where he remained until 2002. From 2002 to 2006, he became photo editor of the Dutch photo magazine Foto. After that he started his career as a full-time freelance photographer.
In 1993, he founded his own photo studio Guarda La Fotografia in Lochristi, where he developed his own poetic style, often referring to the portrait paintings of the Flemish primitives.

In 2000, the National Technical Museum in Prague held a solo exhibition of his work. This show resulted in the development and publication of his first book Auromatic.

His work gets published weekly in several magazines in Belgium: P-Magazine, Knack and Ché.

On the twentieth anniversary of his studio Guarda La Fotografia in 2013 an eponymous book was published, in which photographic portraits of Belgian celebrities, female nudity and humor play an important role.

In 2014 and 2017 in the city center of Ghent, Naudts founded Studio Guarda La Fotografia and Paparazzo, two tourist guesthouses inspired by photography, and wherein some of his photographs are shown.

Together with Dutch writer Julie O'yang Filip Naudts released The Picture of Dorya Glenn, edited October 2017 by Stichting Kunstboek (Belgium) and Delere Press (Singapore). It's a dark surrealistic sci- fi photo novel in which the authors play the main characters: Julie in the shape of the extraterrestrial Dorya Glenn, and Filip as himself. The photo shoots took place in Plomion, a commune in northern France.

In 2018 on the occasion of the 25th anniversary of Guarda La Fotografia, Stadsmuseum Lokeren brought a retrospective exhibition of Naudts' photographic work. Deputy Prime Minister of Belgium Alexander De Croo, among others, visited this exhibition.

Since 2019, Filip Naudts sporadically was invited for Cameos, appeared by himself as a photographer in fictional TV series such as Familie (2019, episode 6335) and Undercover (2019 TV series) (episode 14 'Trojan Horse Power'). 

Naudts' work is represented by Galerie Van Campen & Rochtus in Antwerp and Knokke.

Books by Naudts
Auromatic: Emotional Portraits of Female Alter Ego's. Brugge: Foto Art, 2000. .
Guarda La Fotografia. Oostkamp: Stichting Kunstboek, 2013. 
Paparazzo. Oostkamp: Stichting Kunstboek, 2015. 
The Picture of Dorya Glenn. Oostkamp: Stichting Kunstboek, 2017. With Julie O'yang. . English and Dutch edition.

Gallery

Notes

External links

Belgian photographers
1968 births
Living people